This list comprises players who have appearance in 10 or more league matches for Chicago Red Stars since the team's first Women's Professional Soccer season in 2009.  League appearances, goals and assists comprise those in Women's Professional Soccer, Women's Premier Soccer League, Women's Premier Soccer League Elite and the National Women's Soccer League.

Players with 10 or more appearances
Appearances and goals are for first-team competitive matches only. Substitute appearances are included. Statistics are correct as of 26 October 2017.

Position key:
GK – Goalkeeper; 
DF – Defender;
MF – Midfielder;
FW – Forward

References

Players
Lists of soccer players by club in the United States
Lists of women's association football players
Lists of American sportswomen
Association football player non-biographical articles
Chicago-related lists
Illinois sports-related lists
National Women's Soccer League lists